or  is a Biblical quotation in Latin that literally means "the root of evil is greed", or "the root of evil is want".

This Latin phrase is a translation of the original Greek manuscripts of the Bible.  The Greek text reads "ῥίζα γὰρ πάντων τῶν κακῶν ἐστιν ἡ φιλαργυρία" (1Ti 6:10 BGT) - literally translated into English as "A root of all the evils is the fond love of money".  Daniel Wallace states that ῥίζα (root) is qualitative, since it lacks an article.  A more idiomatic understanding of this phrase is, "For every possible kind of evil can be motivated by the love of money."  Meaning, greed can lead to any number of different kind of evils, not that all evil is rooted in the love of money. In a more humanist light, it can denote the acts that greed makes men do, and also the want of survival that leads to muggings.

It is translated as "the love of money is the root of all evil" in King James Version). It has frequently been rendered as "money is the root of all evil".

The original source is 1 Timothy 6:10 (St Jerome's Vulgate translation). The word cupiditas is ambiguous, as it may also mean cupidity, or strong desire. The Latin phrase is itself a translation from Greek, where the original word philarguria can only mean love of money.

In the medieval poet Geoffrey Chaucer's Pardoner's Tale in The Canterbury Tales, this lesson was illustrated. However, because of the Pardoner's dubious character, the Latin saying has ironic connotations.

The Modern English word cupidity is described by OED as etymologically cognate with Latin cupidus, eagerly desirous. There can be no ambiguity nor misunderstanding of the force of the word as used by Catullus:

The OED definition of cupidity is "Ardent desire, inordinate longing or lust; covetousness", placing the weight firmly on the lecherous side of the reference of this word, which came into English from Latin, and perhaps through French.

That its biblical reference is to the desire of filthy lucre seems established, but to the Latin-literate medieval people, the other cultural reference, to the desires of the flesh, would have suggested an alternative meaning.

See also
List of Latin phrases
Love of money

References

New Testament words and phrases
Latin proverbs